The Röt Formation or Rötton Formation (German for Röt Shale), or Upper Buntsandstein, is a geologic formation of the Buntsandstein in Germany. It preserves fossils dating back to the Middle Triassic Epoch (Anisian or Aegean or Bithynian in the regional stratigraphy). The formation overlies the Plattenstein and Solling Formations and is overlain by the Jena Formation.

The limestones, mudstones, shales and sandstones of the formation, deposited in a shallow marine environment, have provided fossils of early archosaurs, temnospondyls, fish and insects.

Fossil content 
The formation has provided the following fossils:

Correlations 
Based on the fossils of early archosaurs, the formation is correlated with the Donguz Formation of Russia, the upper Heshanggou Formation of China and the Holbrook Member of the Moenkopi Formation of Arizona.

See also 
 List of fossiliferous stratigraphic units in Germany
 Anisian formations
 Besano Formation, fossiliferous formation of the Alps
 Manda Formation, fossiliferous formation of Tanzania
 Omingonde Formation, fossiliferous formation of Namibia

References

Bibliography 

 
 
 
 
 
 
  
 
 
 

Geologic formations of Germany
Triassic System of Europe
Triassic Germany
Anisian Stage
Limestone formations
Mudstone formations
Shale formations
Shallow marine deposits
Fossiliferous stratigraphic units of Europe
Paleontology in Germany